Frank Merle is an American screenwriter, director and producer best known for The Employer and From Jennifer. Also a theatrical producer and director, Merle trained at The Theatre School at DePaul University.

Film career
After graduating summa cum laude from The Theatre School, Merle co-founded Keyhole Theatre Company in the Wicker Park neighborhood of Chicago, IL. He served as Artistic Director of Keyhole Theatre Company for seven years, during which time he directed and produced over thirty professional stage productions, both at Keyhole Theatre and at several other Chicago area theater companies. His first short film, What Joan Knows, earned him an Award for Excellence at the Geneva Film Festival, and his second project, Morgan's Last Call, won Best Short Film at the Cedar Rapids Independent Film Festival. He then made a trilogy of horror shorts, Gnaw, Art Room, and Carnage on Graves Farm, all of which won awards on the festival circuit. These films were then anthologized on home video in 2010 as Carnage, Chaos & Creeps.

Merle's first feature film was the 2013 psychological thriller The Employer, starring Malcolm McDowell and Billy Zane. The film won Best Thriller feature at the Illinois International Film Festival and Best First Feature at the Geneva Film Festival. It was an Opening Night selection at the Shriekfest Film Festival, and was selected for a Special Invitation screening at the Big Bear Horro-Fi Film Festival. The film also won eight awards at the 2013 Los Angeles Movie Awards, including Best Narrative Feature and Best Director.

On June 30, 2016, it was announced on Dread Central that Merle would write and direct From Jennifer, the third installment in the To Jennifer found-footage series originated by James Cullen Bressack.

On January 19, 2017, the first trailer for From Jennifer was posted by the Horror Society. It was revealed that the cast included Tony Todd, Derek Mears and Aaron Abrams. Prior to its official release, the film won several festival awards, including Best Narrative Feature at the Mindfield Film Festival, and Best Director at the Illinois International Film Festival.

Merle lives in Los Angeles and has several feature films in development, including Broken Oaks, Criminality, and Ruinous.

Filmography 
 What Joan Knows (2007)
 Morgan's Last Call (2008)
 Gnaw (2008)
 Art Room (2009)
 Carnage on Graves Farm (2009)
 Carnage, Chaos & Creeps (2010)
 The Employer (2013)
 2 Jennifer (2016) [producer]
 From Jennifer (2017)
 For Jennifer (2018) [producer]
 Tales From the Other Side (2022) [segment director/producer]
 Catfish Christmas (2022) [producer]
 All Gone Wrong (2023) [producer]
 Blood Covered Chocolate (2023) [producer]

References

External links
 Official website

Interviews 
 Shriekfest interview with filmmaker Frank Merle
 Sinful Celluloid interview with director Frank Merle about his wicked "Employer"
 Award-winning director credits success to Park Ridge roots

Living people
American film directors
American film producers
Place of birth missing (living people)
Year of birth missing (living people)
American male screenwriters